Normal-pressure hydrocephalus (NPH), also called malresorptive hydrocephalus, is a form of communicating hydrocephalus in which excess cerebrospinal fluid (CSF) occurs in the ventricles, and with normal or slightly elevated cerebrospinal fluid pressure. As the fluid builds up, it causes the ventricles to enlarge and the pressure inside the head to increase, compressing surrounding brain tissue and leading to neurological complications. The disease presents in a classic triad of symptoms, which are memory impairment, urinary frequency, and balance problems/gait deviations (note: this diagnosis method is obsolete). The disease was first described by Salomón Hakim and Adams in 1965.

The treatment is surgical placement of a ventriculoperitoneal shunt to drain excess CSF into the lining of the abdomen where the CSF will eventually be absorbed. NPH is often misdiagnosed as other conditions including Meniere's disease due to balance problems, Parkinson's disease (due to gait) or Alzheimer's disease (due to cognitive dysfunction).

Signs and symptoms
NPH exhibits a classic triad of clinical findings (known as the Adams triad or Hakim's triad). The triad consists of walking difficulty, reduced attention span, and urinary frequency or incontinence. The triad is considered obsolete for diagnosis purposes and newer guidelines are available.

Gait deviations/balance problems  are present in nearly all patients and usually the first symptom. This is caused by expansion of the lateral ventricles to impinge on the corticospinal tract motor fibers. The typical gait abnormality in NPH is a broad-based, slow, short-stepped, "stuck to the floor", or "magnetic" movement. The gait abnormalities in NPH may bear resemblance to a gait associated with Parkinson's disease. The gait deviation can be classified as mild, marked, or severe: "marked" is when the patient has difficulty walking because of considerable instability; "severe" is when it is not possible for the patient to walk without aids (such as a cane or a wheeled walker).

Dementia presents as progressive cognitive impairment which is present in 60% of patients at time of treatment. This is caused by distortions predominantly at the frontal lobe and the subcortex. Initial deficits involve planning, organization, attention, and concentration. Further deficits include difficulty managing finances, taking medications, driving, keeping track of appointments, daytime sleeping, short-term memory impairments, and psychomotor slowing. Late stage features include apathy, reduced drive, slowed thinking, and reduced speech.

Urinary incontinence appears late in the illness, and is present in 50% of patients at time of treatment. Urinary dysfunction begins as increased frequency often at night, and progresses to urge incontinence and permanent incontinence.

Pathogenesis
Every day, the body makes roughly 600–700 ml of CSF, and about the same amount is reabsorbed into the bloodstream. Hydrocephalus is due to an imbalance between the amount of fluid produced and its absorption rate. Enlarged ventricles put increased pressure on the adjacent cortical tissue and cause myriad effects in the patient, including distortion of the fibers in the corona radiata. This leads to an increase in intracranial pressure (ICP). The ICP gradually falls, but still remains slightly elevated, and the CSF pressure reaches a high normal level of 15 to 20 cm H2O. Measurements of ICP, therefore, are not usually elevated. Because of this, patients do not exhibit the classic signs that accompany increased intracranial pressure such as headache, nausea, vomiting, or altered consciousness, although some studies have shown pressure elevations to occur intermittently.

The exact pathogenesis is unknown, but consensus on some mechanisms include:
 An imbalance exists between production and resorption of CSF.
 The resistance to CSF outflow is often elevated.
 The disease is not caused by overproduction of CSF or obstruction of CSF flow at the ventricles.

The syndrome is often divided into two groups, primary (also called idiopathic) and secondary, based on cause. The underlying etiology of primary NPH has not yet been identified. Primary NPH affects adults age 40 years or older, most commonly affecting the elderly. Secondary NPH can affect persons of any age and occurs due to conditions such as subarachnoid hemorrhage, meningitis, brain surgery, brain radiation, or traumatic brain injury.

Diagnosis

Patients with suspected NPH should have typical symptoms in addition to ventricular enlargement on neuroimaging. The international evidenced-based diagnostic criteria for primary NPH are:
 Gradual onset after age 40 years, symptoms duration of ≥ 3–6 months, clinical evidence of gait or balance impairment, and impairment of cognition or urinary incontinence
 Imaging from magnetic resonance imaging (MRI) or computed tomography (CT) is needed to demonstrate enlarged ventricles and no macroscopic obstruction to cerebrospinal fluid flow.  Imaging should show an enlargement to at least one of the temporal horns of lateral ventricles, and impingement against the falx cerebri resulting in a callosal angle ≤ 90° on the coronal view, showing evidence of altered brain water content, or normal active flow (which is referred to as "flow void") at the cerebral aqueduct and fourth ventricle.

MRI scans are the preferred imaging. The distinction between normal and enlarged ventricular size by cerebral atrophy is difficult to ascertain. Up to 80% of cases are unrecognized and untreated due to difficulty of diagnosis. Imaging should also reveal the absence of any cerebral mass lesions or any signs of obstructions. Although all patients with NPH have enlarged ventricles, not all elderly patients with enlarged ventricles have primary NPH. Cerebral atrophy can cause enlarged ventricles, as well, and is referred to as hydrocephalus ex vacuo.

The Miller Fisher test  involves a high-volume lumbar puncture (LP) with removal of 30–50 ml of CSF. Gait and cognitive function are typically tested just before and within 2–3 hours after the LP to assess for signs of symptomatic improvement. The CSF infusion test and the lumbar test are similar tests to Miller Fisher test. The tests have a positive predictive value over 90%, but a negative predictive value less than 50%. The LP should show normal or mildly elevated CSF pressure. CSF should have normal cell contents, glucose levels, and protein levels.

Treatment

Ventriculoperitoneal shunts 
For suspected cases of NPH, CSF shunting is the first-line treatment. The most common type used to treat NPH is ventriculoperitoneal (VP) shunts, which drain CSF fluid to the peritoneal cavity. Adjustable valves allow fine-tuning of CSF drainage. NPH symptoms reportedly improve in 70–90% of patients with CSF shunt. Risk-benefit analyses have shown beyond any doubt that surgery for NPH is far better than conservative treatment or the natural course.

Gait symptoms improve in ≥ 85% patients. Cognitive symptoms improve in up to 80% of patients when surgery is performed early in the disease course. Urgency and incontinence improves in up to 80% of patients, but only in ≤ 50–60% of patients with shunt implanted late in disease course. The most likely patients to show improvement are those who show only gait deviation, mild or no incontinence, and mild dementia. The risk of adverse events related to shunt placement is 11%, including shunt failure, infections such as ventriculitis, shunt obstruction, over- or under-drainage, and development of a subdural hematoma.

Medications 
No medications are effective for primary NPH. Acetazolamide and other diuretics are not recommended except for limited use in patients who are not candidates for placement of a shunt.

Epidemiology
The majority of cases are primary NPH. Incidence is estimated to 0.3–3% in patients older than 60 years and raising with older age  Its prevalence is reported to be less than 1% in persons under the age of 65, and up to 3% for persons aged 65 or older. No difference in incidence is seen between men and women. Among individuals with dementia, the incidence of NPH is thought to be between 2 and 6%.

See also 
 Low pressure hydrocephalus

References

External links 
 The Normal Pressure Hydrocephalus Center at Johns Hopkins Bayview Medical Center
 Normal Pressure Hydrocephalus at Cleveland Clinic
 
 When it really is NPH at Likvor
 Hydrocephalus in Adults at Spina Bifida Resource Center

Brain disorders
Geriatrics
Ventricular system
Medical triads